Boardman Airport  is a public airport  southwest of the city of Boardman in Morrow County, in the U.S. state of Oregon.

History
The airport was built by the United States Army Air Forces about 1942, and was known as Boardman Flight Strip.  It was an emergency landing airfield for military aircraft on training flights at the Boardman Bombing Range. It was closed after World War II, and was turned over for local government use by the War Assets Administration (WAA).

See also
Lexington Airport

Further reading
 Shaw, Frederick J. (2004), Locating Air Force Base Sites History's Legacy, Air Force History and Museums Program, United States Air Force, Washington DC, 2004.

References

External links

Airports in Morrow County, Oregon
Flight Strips of the United States Army Air Forces
Airfields of the United States Army Air Forces in Oregon
1942 establishments in Oregon